The 2022 Saudi Tour was a road cycling stage race that took place between 1 and 5 February 2022 in Saudi Arabia. The race was rated as a category 2.1 event on the 2022 UCI Asia Tour calendar, and was the sixth edition of the Saudi Tour.

Teams 
Eight of the 18 UCI WorldTeams, five UCI ProTeams, and two UCI Continental teams made up the 15 teams that participated in the race. Of these teams, only eight entered a full squad of seven riders. Five teams (and ) entered six riders each, while the remaining two teams ( and ) entered five riders each. In total, 96 riders started the race, of which 86 finished.

UCI WorldTeams

 
 
 
 
 
 
 
 

UCI ProTeams

 
 
 
 
 

UCI Continental Teams

Route

Stages

Stage 1 
1 February 2022 — Winter Park to Winter Park,

Stage 2 
2 February 2022 — Taibah University to Abu Rakah,

Stage 3 
3 February 2022 — Tayma Hadaj Well to Al Ula Old Town,

Stage 4 
4 February 2022 — Winter Park to Skyviews of Harrat Uwayrid,

Stage 5 
5 February 2022 — Al Ula Old Town to Al Ula Old Town,

Classification leadership table 

 On stage 2, Martin Laas, who was second in the points classification, wore the red jersey, because first-placed Caleb Ewan wore the green jersey as the leader of the general classification.
 On stage 2, Polychronis Tzortzakis, who was second in the active rider classification, wore the blue jersey, because first-placed Martin Urianstad wore the white jersey as the leader of the young rider classification.
 On stages 3 and 4, Anthon Charmig, who was second in the young rider classification, wore the white jersey, because first-placed Santiago Buitrago wore the green jersey as the leader of the general classification. For the same reason, on stage 5, Buitrago wore the white jersey with Maxim Van Gils leading the general classification.

Final classification standings

General classification

Points classification

Active rider classification

Young rider classification

Team classification

References

External links 
 

2022
Saudi Tour
Saudi Tour
Saudi Tour